MASSR may refer to:

 The Moldavian Autonomous Soviet Socialist Republic, an autonomous soviet socialist republic of a union republic of the Soviet Union
 The mass-asymptotic speed relation, a relation between the mass and rotation speed of a disk galaxy, as predicted by Modified Newtonian dynamics